Barry Louis Jaeckel (born February 14, 1949) is an American professional golfer who played on the PGA Tour and the Champions Tour.

Jaeckel was born in Los Angeles, California, and is the son of actor Richard Jaeckel. He attended Palisades High School, Santa Monica Junior College, turned professional in 1971.

Early in his career he played on the European Tour. On the tour's inaugural season, 1972, he won the French Open defeating Clive Clark in a sudden death playoff. Along with Walter Hagen and Byron Nelson, Jaeckel is one of only three Americans ever to win the event.

Jaeckel joined the PGA Tour in 1975. He played in 520 PGA Tour events from 1975–1995 and recorded over two dozen top 10 finishes. Like his French Open triumph, his three best results on the PGA Tour were resolved in playoffs. He won the 1978 Tallahassee Open by shooting a final round 65 (-7) and then defeating Bruce Lietzke in a playoff. At the 1981 Tournament Players Championship he and Curtis Strange lost in a playoff to Raymond Floyd. At the 1983 Kemper Open he lost a five-way playoff to Fred Couples. Jaeckel was 7 shots back entering the day and finished hours before the last group. He passed the time at a bar, hanging out with friends and watching the event on TV. These playoff losses represent his only two runner-up finishes on tour.

His best finish in a major was T-28 at the 1976 U.S. Open.

After reaching the age of 50 in February 1999, Jaeckel joined the Senior PGA Tour. His best finish was a T-10 at the 2000 Audi Senior Classic.

Jaeckel lives in Palm Desert, California.

Amateur wins
1968 Southern California Amateur

Professional wins (2)

PGA Tour wins (1)

PGA Tour playoff record (1–2)

European Tour wins (1)

European Tour playoff record (1–0)

Results in major championships

CUT = missed the half-way cut
"T" = tied

Results in The Players Championship

CUT = missed the halfway cut
"T" indicates a tie for a place

See also 

 Spring 1975 PGA Tour Qualifying School graduates

References

External links

American male golfers
PGA Tour golfers
PGA Tour Champions golfers
Golfers from Los Angeles
People from Palm Desert, California
1949 births
Living people